Annie Bellemare (born January 2, 1980) is a Canadian former competitive figure skater. She is the 2000 Four Continents bronze medallist, 2004 Bofrost Cup on Ice bronze medallist, and a five-time Canadian national medallist.

Personal life 
Bellemare on January 2, 1980, in Laval, Quebec. Following high school, she studied at Collège Édouard-Montpetit in Longueuil, Quebec. She later obtained a marketing management certificate from the British Columbia Institute of Technology (BCIT), a business communications certificate from the Université du Québec à Montréal and a bachelor of commerce from Royal Roads University. She is now working on Ottawa as a successful business executive. She married professional hockey executive Brian Morris on August 6, 2011, in Ottawa. The couple have two children, both boys.

Career 
Bellemare was twelve when she completed her first triple, a Salchow. Early in her career, she was coached by Josee Normand. By 2000, her coach was Stephane Yvars, who changed her technique on triple jumps.

Bellemare won her first national medal, silver, in 1999. She was assigned to her first senior ISU Championship, the 1999 Four Continents, where she placed 12th.

Before the 1999–00 season, Bellemare skated well at a CSFA monitoring event and received her first senior Grand Prix assignments. She finished 10th at the 1999 Sparkassen Cup and 6th at the 1999 NHK Trophy. After taking bronze at the 2000 Canadian nationals, Bellemare was sent to the 2000 Four Continents where she also won bronze.

In 2001, she finished 9th at Four Continents and 21st at the World Championships. She was training in Boucherville, Quebec. In 2002, Bellemare won her second national silver medal and placed 6th at the Four Continents.

Before the 2003–04 season, Bellemare changed coaches to Joanne McLeod in Burnaby and Vancouver, British Columbia. She competed in her fifth Grand Prix season, placing 7th at 2003 Skate America and 6th at 2003 Skate Canada International.

Bellemare withdrew from the 2004 Skate Canada International due to an injury. She last competed at the 2004 Bofrost Cup on Ice, winning bronze. She retired from competition in 2005. During her career, she represented CPA St Eustache.

After working as an administrator at Canlan Ice Sports, Burnaby 8 Rinks in British Columbia, Bellemare became a communications and marketing coordinator for Skate Canada in Ottawa in May 2007.

Programs

Results
GP: Grand Prix

References

External links

 

1980 births
Living people
French Quebecers
Sportspeople from Laval, Quebec
Annie
Canadian female single skaters
Four Continents Figure Skating Championships medalists